Alfred Williams (born 1968) is a retired American football player.

Alfred Williams may also refer to:

Alfred Williams (poet) (1877–1930), British poet

Alfred Walter Williams (1824–1905), Victorian landscape painter
Alfred Williams (cricketer) (1844–?), English cricketer
Al Williams (basketball) (1948–2007), American basketball player
Alfred Williams (umpire) (died 1933), Australian cricket Test match umpire
Alfred Martyn Williams, British Member of Parliament for North Cornwall, 1924–1929
Alfred Williams, lynched on March 12, 1922, see Lynching of William Byrd

See also
Al Williams (disambiguation)